The Luck of Geraldine Laird is a lost 1920 silent film drama directed by Edward Sloman and starring Bessie Barriscale. It was produced by Bessie Barriscale Productions and released through the Robertson Cole Distributing Corp.

Cast
Bessie Barriscale - Geraldine Laird
Niles Welch - Dean Laird
Boyd Irwin - Louis Redding
Dorcas Matthews - Kennedy Bond
William V. Mong - Leo Goldman
Rosita Marstini - Paula Lucas
Ashton Dearholt - George Fitzpatrick
Mary Jane Irving - Child
Jeanne Carpenter - Child (billed Theo-Alice Carpenter)
Maggie Fisher 
Siska Swanson

References

External links

1920 films
Lost American films
American silent feature films
Films directed by Edward Sloman
American black-and-white films
Silent American drama films
1920 drama films
Film Booking Offices of America films
1920 lost films
Lost drama films
1920s American films